Leonard Gordon Wolfson, Baron Wolfson, FRS (11 November 1927 – 20 May 2010) was a British businessman, the former chairman of GUS, and son of GUS magnate Sir Isaac Wolfson, 1st Baronet. He is the father of Janet Wolfson de Botton.

He attended The King's School, Worcester from 1942 to 1945.

Having been knighted in 1977, he was created a Life Peer on 13 June 1985 with the title Baron Wolfson, of Marylebone in the City of Westminster. He was a member of the Conservative Party. On the death of his father in 1991, Lord Wolfson succeeded as 2nd Baronet (styled "of St Marylebone in the County of London"). He was granted a leave of absence from the House of Lords from 2008.

He was Chairman of the Wolfson Foundation. He was elected an Honorary Fellow of the British Academy in 1986, and an Honorary Fellow of the Royal Society in 2005. He was also an Honorary Fellow of three Oxford colleges, Wolfson College (named after his father Isaac Wolfson), St Catherine's College, and Worcester College.

He died on 20 May 2010.

Lord Wolfson was a philanthropist, supporting many causes: he was president of the Jewish Welfare Board, and a trustee of the Imperial War Museum. The Lord Leonard and Lady Estelle Wolfson Foundation was set up in 2012, and continues to support scientific and medical research, education and the arts.

See also
Victor Barnett, his cousin
David Wolfson, Baron Wolfson of Sunningdale, his cousin
Simon Wolfson, Baron Wolfson of Aspley Guise, his cousin's son
 Wolfson family

References

1927 births
2010 deaths
Baronets in the Baronetage of the United Kingdom
British businesspeople in retailing
Conservative Party (UK) life peers
English people of Polish-Jewish descent
English philanthropists
Honorary Fellows of the British Academy
Fellows of the Royal Society
Honorary Fellows of the Royal Society
Knights Bachelor
People educated at King's School, Worcester
Jewish British politicians
20th-century British philanthropists
Life peers created by Elizabeth II